In geometry, the elongated pentagonal orthobicupola or cantellated pentagonal prism is one of the Johnson solids. As the name suggests, it can be constructed by elongating a pentagonal orthobicupola by inserting a decagonal prism between its two congruent halves. Rotating one of the cupolae through 36 degrees before inserting the prism yields an elongated pentagonal gyrobicupola.

Formulae
The following formulae for volume and surface area can be used if all faces are regular, with edge length a:

References

External links
 

Johnson solids